The 1905 Kilkenny Senior Hurling Championship was the 17th staging of the Kilkenny Senior Hurling Championship since its establishment by the Kilkenny County Board.

On 3 June 1906, Erin's Own won the championship after a 5-06 to 2-08 defeat of Tullaroan in the final. This was their first championship title.

Results

Final

References

Kilkenny Senior Hurling Championship
Kilkenny Senior Hurling Championship